Ivan Smiljanić (born 4 April 1989) is a Serbian professional basketball player who currently plays for Tamiš of the Basketball League of Serbia.

References

External links
 Adriatic League Profile

1989 births
Living people
ABA League players
Basketball players from Belgrade
Basketball League of Serbia players
Forwards (basketball)
KK Crvena zvezda players
KK FMP players
KK FMP (1991–2011) players
KK Dynamic players
KK Tamiš players
KK Radnički FMP players
MBK Handlová players
OKK Beograd players
Serbian expatriate basketball people in Lithuania
Serbian expatriate basketball people in Slovakia
Serbian men's basketball players
Universiade medalists in basketball
Universiade bronze medalists for Serbia
Medalists at the 2013 Summer Universiade